Ayoub Mashhor (Arabic:أيوب مشهور) (born 14 June 1995) is a Qatari footballer. He currently plays as a midfielder for Muaither.

External links

References

Qatari footballers
1995 births
Living people
Al Sadd SC players
Al-Shamal SC players
Al-Shahania SC players
Lusail SC players
Muaither SC players
Qatar Stars League players
Qatari Second Division players
Association football midfielders